Ebrahim Moosa is the Mirza Family Professor of Islamic Thought & Muslim Societies at the University of Notre Dame with appointments in the Department of History and in the Kroc Institute for International Studies in the Keough School of Global Affairs. He is co-director of the Contending Modernities program at Notre Dame.  He was previously Professor of Religion and Islamic Studies at Duke University. He is considered a leading scholar of contemporary Muslim thought. Moosa has been named as one of the top 500 Influential Muslims in the World.

According to the contemporary scholar Adis Duderija, Moosa is "one of the most prominent intellectual theoreticians behind progressive Muslim thought." According to UCLA Professor Khaled Abou El Fadl, Moosa is "a formidable Muslim intellectual and scholar." 

In 2007, he was invited to deliver his lecture, "Ethical Challenges in Contemporary Islamic Thought," in Morocco, which was attended by King Muhammad VI.

Moosa specializes in classical and medieval Muslim thought, Islamic ethics/law, and religion and modernity. He completed his theological training in the early 1980s in India, graduating with specialization in the traditional Islamic sciences from Darul Ulum Nadwatul 'Ulama in Lucknow, India. His Ph.D. is from the University of Cape Town, where he taught until the late 1990s. He was visiting professor of Islamic studies at Stanford University from 1998-2001. From 2001 to 2014, he taught in the Religion department at Duke University. In the Fall of 2014 he moved to Notre Dame.

Moosa is the author of Ghazali and the Poetics of Imagination (UNC Press, 2005), which won the American Academy of Religion's Best First Book in the History of Religions Award in 2006. He authored What is a Madrasa?, (UNC Press, 2015). He edited and wrote the introduction to Fazlur Rahman's Revival and Reform in Islam: A Study of Islamic Fundamentalism (Oneworld, 1999), Islam in the Modern World (with Jeffrey Kenney; Routledge, 2013), and Muslim Family Law in Sub-Saharan Africa: Colonial Legacies and Post-colonial Challenges (with Shamil Jeppie and Richard Roberts; Amsterdam University Press, 2010).

Moosa's articles have appeared in Middle East Law and Governance, Journal of the American Academy of Religion, Journal for Islamic and Near Eastern Law, The Journal of Law and Religion, Islamic Studies, History of Religions, Islamic Law and Society, and Der Islam, among others.

Sources
Carl W. Ernst and Richard Martin (eds.) Rethinking Islamic Studies: From Orientalism to Cosmopolitanism (University of South Carolina Press, 2010).
Adis Duderija. Constructing a Religiously Ideal "Believer" and "Woman" in Islam: Neo-traditional Salafi and Progressive Muslims' Methods of Interpretation (New York: Palgrave Macmillan, 2011)
Omid Safi (ed.) Progressive Muslims: On Justice, Gender, and Pluralism (Oxford: Oneworld, 2003)
Deborah Caldwell, "Hajj in a Time of War: An Interview with Ebrahim Moosa" in Michael Wolfe, Taking Back Islam: American Muslims Reclaim Their Faith (Rodale, 2004)
James Boyd White (ed.) How Should We Talk about Religion?: Perspectives, Contexts, Particularities (Notre Dame: University of Notre Dame Press, 2006)

References

External links 
Official website
Duke University Department of Religious Studies Website
Duke Theologian on Scholarship, Advocacy, and Activism
Deleuzian Musings on Ghazali and the Poetics of Imagination
Ebrahim Moosa's page at The Immanent Frame 
Ebrahim Moosa on the Challenges Facing Islam

Living people
American Muslims
Duke University faculty
University of Notre Dame faculty
21st-century Muslim scholars of Islam
University of Cape Town alumni
Academic staff of the University of Cape Town
American Islamic studies scholars
Year of birth missing (living people)
Muslim scholars of Islamic studies